Christian Tessier (born January 1, 1978) is a Canadian actor and singer who began his career as a child actor on You Can't Do That On Television. He has since appeared in numerous TV and film roles.

Early life
Tessier was born in Toronto on January 1, 1978. He graduated from Etobicoke School of the Arts with a course of acting.

Career

Early career
Tessier first came to television in 1989, appearing in 18 episodes of the Canadian children's show You Can't Do That on Television. He notably appeared in the remake of The Tomorrow People (1992 to 1995), and the motion picture adaptation of Battlefield Earth as Mickey. He also appeared on two episodes in the TV series Are You Afraid of the Dark? (1992's "Laughing in the Dark" and 1994's "The Curious Camera"). He also appeared in the teen drama special, Crystal Clear, and on a 1996 episode of the TV series Goosebumps ("Say Cheese and Die!").

Later career
Later in his career, Tessier appeared in A Call to Remember and five episodes of Battlestar Galactica as Tucker Clellan, Duck served as a Colonial Viper pilot aboard the Battlestar Galactica and was a central character in the webisode series Battlestar Galactica: The Resistance. He also had played Aaron in The Day After Tomorrow, but his scene was deleted. In this scene Aaron is a surfer and is killed by a tsunami. He played a minor role in the gay-themed mystery Ice Blues. He appeared in the 2014 Godzilla, but his part was cut for the final film. He also appeared in Wayward Pines and 19-2.

Singing career
On December 13, 2011, Tessier appeared in a song "Whatever It Is" with Rel!g!on.

Personal life
He currently lives in Canada.

Filmography

Film

Television

References

External links

1978 births
20th-century Canadian male actors
21st-century Canadian male actors
Canadian male child actors
Canadian male film actors
Canadian male television actors
Canadian male voice actors
Living people